St George's Church, Portobello, is a former Church of England parish church in the City of Sheffield, England. It is now part of the University of Sheffield and is a lecture theatre and student housing.

St George's is the first of three Commissioners' churches to have been built in Sheffield under the Church Building Act 1818. The other two are St Mary's Church, Bramall Lane and St Philip's Church, Netherthorpe (demolished 1951). St George's is a Gothic Revival building designed by the architects Woodhead and Hurst in a Perpendicular Gothic style. It was built at a cost of £15,181, the whole cost being met by the Church Building Commission.

Galleries extended the length of the north and south walls, and there was a two-tiered gallery on the west wall. In total the church could seat 380 people. The foundation stone was laid on 19 July 1821, and the church was consecrated by Archbishop Vernon Harcourt on 29 June 1825.

The church was declared redundant and closed in 1981. It stood unused for a number of years until the University of Sheffield acquired it and in 1994 had it converted into a lecture theatre and student accommodation. Prior to this it had been the last of the Commissioners' churches in Sheffield to retain its original form. It is a Grade II listed building.

In 2010 a nest-box was placed on the church rooftop, which is now home to a breeding pair of peregrine falcons that can be seen via live stream webcam.

See also

Listed buildings in Sheffield
List of Commissioners' churches in Yorkshire

References

19th-century Church of England church buildings
Churches completed in 1825
Saint George
Church of England church buildings in South Yorkshire
Commissioners' church buildings
Former Church of England church buildings
Gothic Revival church buildings in England
Grade II listed buildings in Sheffield
Grade II listed churches in South Yorkshire
Halls of residence in the United Kingdom
Sheffield University buildings and structures